The Aytos Logistics Center comprises military storage facilities located near the town of Aytos, designated for development in support of the Novo Selo Range.

The Aytos Logistics Center is among the joint US-Bulgarian military bases established according to the 2006 Defense Cooperation Agreement between the United States and Bulgaria.

See also
Bulgarian-American Joint Military Facilities

References 
 L. Ivanov and P. Pantev eds., The Joint Bulgarian-American Military Facilities: Public opinion and strategic, political, economic, and environmental aspects, NI Plus Publishing House, Sofia, 2006 (in Bulgarian)
 L. Ivanov ed., Bulgaria: Bezmer and adjacent regions – Guide for American military, Multiprint Ltd., Sofia, 2007, 

Military installations of Bulgaria
Military installations of the United States in Bulgaria
Military logistics of the United States